Marvin Stewart Jr. (born September 16, 1995) is an American football safety for the Houston Texans of the National Football League (NFL). He played college football at North Carolina. He was drafted by the Tampa Bay Buccaneers in the second round of the 2018 NFL Draft.

College career
During his sophomore season, Stewart was suspended from the team due to a violation of team rules, along with teammate Mike Hughes.  He was later charged with misdemeanor assault and battery, but charges were later dropped.  Stewart was reinstated less than a week later.  There was speculation that Stewart would forgo his senior year and declare for the 2017 NFL draft, but he later announced that he would return for the 2017 season.  Following his senior season, Stewart was named to the First-team All-ACC by Pro Football Focus.

Professional career

Tampa Bay Buccaneers
The Tampa Bay Buccaneers selected Stewart in the second round (53rd overall) of the 2018 NFL Draft. Stewart was the fifth cornerback drafted in 2018.

On May 10, 2018, the Tampa Bay Buccaneers signed Stewart to a four-year, $5.08 million contract that includes $2.48 million guaranteed and a signing bonus of $1.77 million.

Throughout training camp, Stewart competed to be a starting cornerback against Ryan Smith, Vernon Hargreaves, and Carlton Davis. Head coach Dirk Koetter named Stewart the fifth cornerback on the depth chart to start the regular season, behind Brent Grimes, Vernon Hargreaves, Carlton Davis, and Ryan Smith.

He made his professional regular season debut in the Tampa Bay Buccaneers’ season-opener at the New Orleans Saints and recorded four solo tackles during their 48-40 victory. The following week, he earned his first career start after Vernon Hargreaves sustained a shoulder injury the previous week and was placed on injured reserve. Stewart finished the Buccaneers’ 27-21 win against the Philadelphia Eagles with five combined tackles. In a Week 3, Stewart collected a season-high nine solo tackles and broke up a pass attempt during a 30-27 loss against the Pittsburgh Steelers. Stewart was inactive for five games (Weeks 9-13) after injuring his foot. Stewart lost his role as a starting cornerback to Ryan Smith during his absence and remained a backup for the last four games of the season. Stewart finished his rookie season in 2018 with 33 combined tackles (31 solo) and three pass deflections in 11 games and five starts.

On August 6, 2020, Stewart was waived by the Buccaneers.

Cleveland Browns
Stewart was claimed off waivers by the Cleveland Browns on August 8, 2020.

In Week 4 against the Dallas Cowboys, Stewart recorded his first career sack on Dak Prescott during the 49–38 win. 
In Week 13 against the Tennessee Titans, Stewart recorded his first career interception off a pass thrown by Ryan Tannehill during the 41–35 win. 

In the Wild Card round of the playoffs against the Pittsburgh Steelers, Stewart led the team with 10 tackles and intercepted a pass thrown by Ben Roethlisberger during the 48–37 win.

On October 12, 2021, Stewart was placed on injured reserve. He was activated on November 13.

Houston Texans
On March 24, 2022, Stewart signed with the Houston Texans.

On March 15, 2023, Stewart signed a two-year contract extension with the Texans.

References

External links
North Carolina Tar Heels bio

1995 births
Living people
Players of American football from Virginia
Sportspeople from Arlington County, Virginia
American football cornerbacks
North Carolina Tar Heels football players
Tampa Bay Buccaneers players
Cleveland Browns players
Houston Texans players
Yorktown High School (Virginia) alumni